Aulacodes exhibitalis is a moth in the family Crambidae. It was described by Francis Walker in 1862. It is found in the Amazon region.

References

Acentropinae
Moths described in 1862
Moths of South America